Rumbek North County is an administrative area (county) located in Lakes State, South Sudan. In August 2016, the former Rumbek North County had split to create Aloor County and Malueth County.

References

Counties of South Sudan